The Nevada City Downtown Historic District is a  historic district in Nevada City within the U.S. state of California. Located in Nevada County, it was listed on the National Register of Historic Places in 1985.  It dates from 1917, with examples of Moderne and Italianate architecture. The period of significance is 1856-1917. The historic district covers the downtown section roughly bounded by Spring, Bridge, Commercial, York, Washington, Coyote, and Main Streets. It includes 70 contributing buildings including the National Hotel, which is separately listed on the National Register. Several historical buildings have received California Historical Landmark status, and have been preserved.

Numbering
 Buildings on Broad Street, numbered from 211 to 420
 Buildings on Commercial Street, numbered from 200 to 405
 Buildings on Main Street, numbered from 30 through 308
 Buildings on South Pine Street, numbered from 108  to 203
 Buildings on North Pine Street, numbered from 108-1/2 to 231
 Buildings on Springs Street, numbered from 300 to 325
 Buildings on Church Street, numbered 214 to 222
 Buildings on Washington Street, numbered 310 and 317

Buildings
 National Hotel, 211 Broad Street
 Court house in Courthouse Square and city hall Art deco facades are attributable to Works Progress Administration projects.
 St. Canice Catholic Church, 317 Washington Street
 Doris Foley Library for Historical Research (NRHP No. 90001809), 211 (re-numbered 231) North Pine Street, is a Carnegie library.
 Miners Foundry (CHL No. 1012), 325 Spring Street, was the first manufacturing location of the Pelton wheel.
 National Hotel (CHL No. 899), 211 Broad Street, is one of the oldest continuously operating hotels west of the Rocky Mountains.
 Nevada City Firehouse No. 2 is a Neoclassical-Greek Revival style building. The firehouse was built in 1860 and was added to the National Register of Historic Places on May 3, 1974.
 Nevada Brewery (NRHP No. 85002303), 107 Sacramento Street, was used for brewing and serving lager beer to the mining community.
 Nevada Theatre (CHL No. 863), 401 Broad Street, is California's oldest original-use theatre.
 Ott's Assay Office
 The South Yuba Canal Office (CHL No. 832) was the headquarters for the largest network of water flumes and ditches in California.  Located at 134 Main Street, it was the headquarters for the largest network of water flumes and ditches in California. It became a California Historical Landmark in May 1970.
Built in 1855, it was originally known as the Potter Building.  A two-story brick structure, it was fitted with iron doors and shutters, plus a filigree balcony railing.
The company's original ditch was put into use in 1850. The South Yuba Canal is now part of the public lands of the Tahoe National Forest. The South Yuba Canal System is used for delivering domestic and agricultural water to Nevada City and its neighbor Grass Valley. The water also generates electricity in Northern California. Crossing private and National Forest lands, the canal is bordered by conifers and hardwoods.

Gallery

References

Nevada City, California
Historic districts on the National Register of Historic Places in California
History of Nevada City, California
National Register of Historic Places in Nevada County, California
Buildings and structures in Nevada City, California
Geography of Nevada County, California
Italianate architecture in California
Moderne architecture in California
Victorian architecture in California